Paul Shaw (born 20 April 1949) is a Canadian sports shooter. He competed in the men's trap event at the 1996 Summer Olympics.

References

External links

Further reading
 

1949 births
Living people
Canadian male sport shooters
Olympic shooters of Canada
Shooters at the 1996 Summer Olympics
Sportspeople from Collingwood, Ontario
Pan American Games medalists in shooting
Pan American Games silver medalists for Canada
Pan American Games bronze medalists for Canada
Shooters at the 1987 Pan American Games
Shooters at the 1995 Pan American Games
Shooters at the 2015 Pan American Games
20th-century Canadian people
Medalists at the 1987 Pan American Games